Kolivand (also Romanized as Kolīvand) is a village in Malavi Rural District, in the Central District of Pol-e Dokhtar County, Lorestan Province, Iran. At the 2006 census, its population was 547, in 121 families.

References 

Towns and villages in Pol-e Dokhtar County